The Meetinghouse under the Ledge, also known as the Old Ledge Meetinghouse, was a church that stood in present-day Yarmouth, Maine, between 1729 (when the town was North Yarmouth, Province of Massachusetts Bay) and 1836 (sixteen years after Maine's admittance to the Union). It was the ninth church founded in Maine.

Named for the ledge that rises to the west of its former location, only the church's eastern doorstep remains, beside today's Garrison Lane.

History
The congregation was founded in November 1730, and its first minister was Reverend Ammi Ruhamah Cutter. Some members of the congregation had to travel several miles to attend sermons, some arriving by boat from today's Harpswell. They were armed with muskets, wary of hostile Indians.

The church was enlarged and had a steeple and a copper banner weathervane added in 1762.

In 1836, sixteen years after the meetinghouse was abandoned, it was torn down. The weathervane was rescued during  the demolition work. In 1838, it was mounted as a shipping guide on an iron rod atop the ledge, overlooking the meetinghouse, by a group of Yarmouth residents. They had raised funds to buy the weathervane from Solomon Winslow, who had removed it from the demolition site. The weathervane is now on display at the Yarmouth History Center, but its old supports still exist high up in the woods on the western side of Lafayette Street. They are passed by the West Side Trail.

Parsonage
The garrison-style house (now known as the Cutter House) at 60 Gilman Road, built circa 1730, is the oldest standing house in Yarmouth. It was the parsonage of the Ledge Church's first minister, Reverend Ammi Ruhamah Cutter. (Cutter was succeeded in the role by Nicholas Loring, who is buried in the Ledge Cemetery.) Perez B. Loring lived there in the mid-19th century.

Cemeteries
Two cemeteries are located nearby. Across Gilman Road from the former parsonage is the small, half-acre 1731 Pioneer Cemetery (also known as the Indian Fighters cemetery), which was the first public burial place in Old North Yarmouth. At the corner of Gilman Road and Lafayette Street is the 2.5-acre 1770 Ledge Cemetery. (Some headstones bear dates earlier than 1770, for many bodies were removed from the older cemetery.)

Tristram Gilman, for whom Gilman Road is named, was the fourth pastor at the meetinghouse, after the controversial Edward Brooks. He served in the role for forty years, and was buried in the Ledge Cemetery upon his death in 1809, aged 73. His wife, Elizabeth Sayer, is buried beside him.

References

External links
Official website of today's church

Churches in Yarmouth, Maine
Churches on the National Register of Historic Places in Maine
Churches completed in 1729
18th-century churches in the United States
Demolished churches in the United States
Former churches in Maine
1730 establishments in the Thirteen Colonies
1836 disestablishments in the United States
Demolished buildings and structures in Maine
Buildings and structures demolished in 1836